Events from the year 1503 in the Kingdom of Scotland.

Incumbents
Monarch – James IV

Events
 8 August – marriage of James IV and Margaret Tudor

Deaths
 11 March – John Stewart, Earl of Mar (born 1479)
 20 May – William Borthwick, 3rd Lord Borthwick
unknown date
 John Macdonald II, the last Lord of the Isles (born 1434)

See also

 Timeline of Scottish history

References

 
Years of the 16th century in Scotland